The name "Tjorven" is a fictional character created by Astrid Lindgren. It comes from a popular Swedish family show on television in the early 1960s. Based on a script by the Swedish author Astrid Lindgren, the story is about a number of characters living in the archipelago outside Stockholm.  A central character is a plump and sunny little girl nicknamed Tjorven.

In the movies of Saltkråkan the character was portrayed by Swedish actress Maria Johansson.

Miscellaneous 
In Stieg Larsson's The Girl with the Dragon Tattoo, 'Tjorven' appears also as the name for a cat character Mikael Blomkvist finds during his stay at a guest house.

Tjorven was also one of many nicknames for a woman who was accused of eating children in Romania.

References

Astrid Lindgren characters
Fictional Swedish people
Characters in children's literature
Female characters in literature
Child characters in literature